John Wussow (February 16, 1879 – May 19, 1920) was an American gymnast. He competed in four events at the 1904 Summer Olympics.

References

External links
 

1879 births
1920 deaths
American male artistic gymnasts
Olympic gymnasts of the United States
Gymnasts at the 1904 Summer Olympics
Sportspeople from Milwaukee